The Hundred of Stow is the cadastral unit of hundred on the northern Adelaide Plains. It is one of the 16 hundreds of the County of Stanley. It was named in 1867 by Governor Dominick Daly after Randolph Isham Stow (1828–1878), twice Attorney-General of South Australia. Parts of the localities of Mount Templeton, Stow, Whitwarta, Watchman and Balaklava are within the hundred.

Local government
On 14 November 1878, the entire Hundred of Stow was annexed to the District Council of Balaklava along with an eastern strip of the Hundred of Goyder, following petitioning by resident landowners.

The hundred was locally governed by District Council of Wakefield Plains from 1983 following the amalgamation of Balaklava council with Port Wakefield and Owen councils. In 1997 the merger of Wakefield Plains and Blyth-Snowtown councils brought hundred under the governance of Wakefield Regional Council with the North ward and Central ward boundary passing east to west through the middle of the hundred.

See also
Lands administrative divisions of South Australia

References 

Stow